Eva Švíglerová (born 13 July 1971) is a Czech former professional tennis player. She enjoyed success as a junior player, winning the 1989 Australian Open in girls' doubles, along with Andrea Strnadová. The two were also the finalists of the 1989 Wimbledon Championships.  At this event, it was rumoured by some reporters that she played one match in the tournament without knickers.

The same year, Švíglerová reached the final in girls' singles of the French Open, losing to future World No. 1 player Jennifer Capriati 6–4, 6–0.

As a professional, Švíglerová won one WTA title, the ASB Classic in 1991. From 1988 to 1993, she also won five additional ITF titles. In doubles, Švíglerová won the Brasil Open in 1991 partnering with Bettina Fulco. She achieved her career–high singles ranking, World No. 33, on 21 October 1991.

Career statistics

WTA singles finals: 1 (1–0)

WTA doubles finals: 2 (1–1)

ITF singles finals: 6 (5–1)

ITF doubles finals: 1 (0–1)

Junior Grand Slam singles finals: 1 (0–1)

Junior Grand Slam doubles finals: 2 (1–1)

Grand Slam performance timeline

References

External links 
 
 

1971 births
Czech female tennis players
Czechoslovak female tennis players
Living people
Grand Slam (tennis) champions in girls' doubles
Australian Open (tennis) junior champions